Adrian Sitaru is a Romanian director, producer and actor, born in 1971. He is the author of several short films, of which Valuri ("Waves", 2007), the most well-known, has received numerous prizes.
Notably, he also worked with Costa Gavras in the making of Amen. (2002).

His first feature film, Pescuit sportiv ("Hooked"), for which, besides being the director, he also wrote the script, has been screened in film festivals from Toronto, Palm Springs, Estoril and in the main competition of the 2009 Premiers Plans Festival in Angers, France.

In 2010, his latest short film, Colivia ("The Cage") won the DAAD Short Film Award at the 60th Berlin International Film Festival (Berlinale).

Selected filmography
 The Fixer (2016)

External links
 
 Presentation of "Hooked" at the 2009 Festival de Film d'Angers
 Official site of "Hooked"

1971 births
Romanian film directors
Living people
People from Deva, Romania